Bernard Kalb (February 4, 1922 – January 8, 2023) was an American journalist, moderator, media critic, lecturer, and author.

Early life and education
Kalb was born in New York City on February 4, 1922, the son of Bella (Portnoy) and Max Kalb. His father was a Polish Jewish immigrant and his mother was a Ukrainian Jew. He graduated from the City College of New York with a B.S.S. and later received an M.A. from Harvard University.

Career
Kalb covered international affairs for more than three decades at CBS News, NBC News, and The New York Times. For nearly half of that time he was abroad, based in Indonesia, Hong Kong, Paris, and Saigon.

Near the end of his tenure at the Times, Kalb received a fellowship from the Council on Foreign Relations—awarded annually to a foreign correspondent—and took a leave from the newspaper for a year. 

Bernard Kalb and his younger brother, journalist Marvin Kalb, traveled extensively with Henry Kissinger on diplomatic missions and they later wrote a biography titled Kissinger. The brothers also co-authored The Last Ambassador, a novel about the collapse of Saigon in 1975.

In 1984, Kalb was appointed Assistant Secretary of State for Public Affairs and spokesman for the U.S. State Department. It was the first time that a journalist who covered the State Department had been named as its spokesperson.

Kalb quit this post two years later to protest what he called "the reported disinformation program" conducted by the Reagan Administration against the Libyan leader Col. Muammar al-Gaddafi. Kalb said, "you face a choice, as an American, as a spokesman, as a journalist, whether to allow oneself to be absorbed in the ranks of silence, whether to vanish into unopposed acquiescence or to enter a modest dissent. Faith in the word of America is the pulse beat of our democracy".

In his later career, Kalb traveled as a lecturer and moderator. He was the founding anchor and a panelist on the weekly CNN program Reliable Sources from 1993 to 1998.

Awards and honors
Kalb won an Overseas Press Club Award for a 1968 documentary on the Vietcong.

Personal life and death 
Kalb and his wife, Phyllis Bernstein, had four daughters. He turned 100 on February 4, 2022.

On January 2, 2023, Kalb suffered a fall and died from his injuries six days later at his home in North Bethesda, Maryland. He was 100.

References

External links

1922 births
2023 deaths
20th-century American journalists
21st-century American journalists
Accidental deaths from falls
Accidental deaths in Maryland
American centenarians
American expatriates in France
American expatriates in Hong Kong
American expatriates in Indonesia
American expatriates in Vietnam
American male journalists
American male non-fiction writers
American television reporters and correspondents
American war correspondents of the Vietnam War
American war correspondents
CNN people
City College of New York alumni
Harvard University alumni
Journalists from New York City
Men centenarians
NBC News people
Television anchors from New York City
The New York Times writers
United States Assistant Secretaries of State
United States Department of State spokespeople